The Sunday Format, "BBC Radio 4's first high-quality weekend broadsheet newspaper", is a British satirical radio comedy. The programme is a parody of British middle class newspapers, in particular the lifestyle supplements and glossy celebrity magazines that fill Sunday papers. The programme consists of a series of short sketches that dramatise the articles in the eponymous newspaper, with the cast assuming accents to convey the characters of the journalists or columnists. The articles are presented in the format of a British Sunday newspaper, with the copy distributed in columns across the body of the paper, and commonly feature lists of items or instructions. Sketches are broken up, and often use backing music which also stops and starts along with the reading of the column. This leads to a surreal, Dadaist juxtaposition of sketches, with jokes being set up at the beginning of the episode and the punchline being delivered at a random point before the end.

Conception 

The show was first heard in 1996 in a one-off pilot episode. It did not return until a four-part series aired in Feb/Mar 1999, followed by six episodes in Nov/Dec 2000, and three additional four-part series in Sep/Oct 2001, Jan 2003 and Jan/Feb 2004. The show has won a Sony Radio Award and a British Comedy Award.

The show was devised by John Morton and was produced by Paul Schlesinger and Helen Williams. The writing team is Simon Blackwell, Nick Revell, Dave Cohen, Ewan Bailey, Emma Kennedy, Bill Dare, Laurence Howarth, Andrew Marlatt and Tony Roche. The cast is Ewan Bailey, Rebecca Front, Simon Greenall, Emma Kennedy, Chris Langham, Tracy-Ann Oberman, and Alice Arnold. Alexander Armstrong, Ben Miller, Martin Hyder and Siriol Jenkins also appeared in the earlier series.

See also
 People Like Us
 The Harpoon

External links
 Sunday Format page on Radio 4 site
 h2g2: Sunday Format

BBC Radio comedy programmes
Sunday_Format